Rhododendron xanthocodon (黄铃杜鹃) is a rhododendron species native to northeastern India, Tibet, and Bhutan, where it grows at altitudes of . The flowers are creamy yellow.

Synonyms
 Rhododendron cinnabarinum var. purpurellum 
 Rhododendron cinnabarinum subsp. xanthocodon 
 Rhododendron concatenans

References
 Hutchinson, Gard. Chron., ser. 3. 95: 409. 1934.
 The Plant List
 Flora of China

xanthocodon